Mba Vitus Onyekachi (born 28 August 1984 in Nigeria) is a Nigerian former footballer who is currently head coach at Indera SC of the Brunei Super League.

Singapore

Although not aggressive, Onyekachi, known by 'Bapak' to his teammates at Balestier Khalsa, was seen as a veritable threat to the opposition's attack, breaking up their offensive movements through the midfield. However, in 2008, the Nigerian midfielder caught a stomach virus, causing him to miss a few games.

References

External links 
 Youtube
 at Soccerway

1984 births
Association football midfielders
Expatriate footballers in Singapore
Nigerian footballers
Nigerian expatriate sportspeople in Brunei
Rakhine United F.C. players
Ayeyawady United F.C. players
Expatriate footballers in Myanmar
Balestier Khalsa FC players
Singapore Premier League players
Nigerian expatriate footballers
Myanmar National League players
Expatriate football managers in Brunei
Living people